Coca-Cola Arena is a multi-purpose arena located in the City Walk area in Dubai in the United Arab Emirates. The venue was opened on June 6, 2019. It has a capacity of 17,000.

Owned by Meraas and operated by ASM Global, the arena hosts events that include concerts, sport, family entertainment and ceremonies.

Construction

Roof structure
Coca-Cola Arena is one of the most technologically advanced arenas in the world. The roof structure can support 190 metric tonnes.

Façade lighting
The front of the Coca-Cola Arena has a façade lighting system made up of 4,600 LED's. The arena is traditionally lit up in red to represent the name of the arena.

Bowl seating modes

Coca-Cola Arena can accommodate up to 17,000 people and be arranged in an array of different seating and viewing modes including end-stage, in-the-round and intimate mode. This means it can host everything from large-scale music concerts to shows and gala dinner evenings. The main bowl features four levels. Levels one and four are made up of fixed seating while levels two and three consist of hospitality suites. An extra tier of seating can be added due to automatic retractable seating on the bowl floor. A viewing terrace is also positioned at the stage end of the arena on level three and can be used for premium packages and after-show parties.

Location
Coca-Cola Arena is located in City Walk, an urban leisure destination in central Dubai.

References

External links

 

2019 establishments in the United Arab Emirates
Sports venues completed in 2019
Indoor arenas in the United Arab Emirates
Entertainment venues in the United Arab Emirates
Sports venues in Dubai
Coca-Cola buildings and structures